Profronde van Oostvoorne is an elite men's and women's professional road bicycle racing event held annually in Oostvoorne, the Netherlands. The first edition was in 1985. The event is one of the post-Tour de France criteriums.

Honours

Men's 

Source

Women's 

Source

References

External links
 

Men's road bicycle races
Women's road bicycle races
Recurring sporting events established in 1985
1985 establishments in the Netherlands
Cycling in South Holland